Government College for Women, Nawakadal Srinagar (Urdu) commonly known as Women's college Nawakadal, Nowkadal College is a University Grants Commission recognized 2B and 12f college located in Old City Downtown Srinagar. It was established in 1961.The college is affiliated with the University of Kashmir. It is the only Women Institution in Kashmir Valley offering Commerce & management Courses.

It has been awarded grade "A" by the NAAC.

Location 
Women's College Nawakadal is located on the Southern bank of river Jehlum near the Nawakadal Bridge in old city of Srinagar locally known as Shehr-i-Khaas. It is the only institution of Higher Education for Women ideally located in Old City Srinagar (Downtown).

Establishment 
The Government of Jammu and Kashmir established the college in 1961 with Arts and Science subjects and a teaching faculty of 19 members with just 50 students. It was established during the reign of the then Prime Minister of Jammu and Kashmir Bakshi Ghulam Mohamad.

History 
Women's college Nawakadal has a historical background. It is located adjacent to the historical Maharaj Gunj, the Capital of Maharaja regime and historical trade centre of Downtown Srinagar locally known as Shehr-i-Khaas.The college campus was initially the women's hospital founded by Maharaja Pratap Singh in 1890.Later the hospital was converted into high school.

In 1952 the then Prime Minister of Jammu and Kashmir Sheikh Mohamad Abdullah ordered for its elevation to women's college and it was achieved during the era of the then Prime Minister of Jammu and Kashmir Bakshi Ghulam Mohamad in 1961.

Courses offered 
 Bachelor of Arts
 Bachelor of Science (Medical)
 Bachelor of Science (Non Medical)
 Bachelor of Commerce (Computerized Accountancy)
 Bachelor of Business Administration
 Bachelor of Arts (Social Science)

Awards and achievements 
The National Assessment and Accreditation Council (NAAC)  has accredited the Government College for Women, Nawakadal Srinagar, with Grade"A" in the year 2015.

See also 
Women's College M.A Road Srinagar
Government College for Women, Baramulla

References 

Degree colleges in Kashmir Division
Universities and colleges in Srinagar
University of Kashmir
Women's universities and colleges in Jammu and Kashmir
1961 establishments in Jammu and Kashmir
Educational institutions established in 1961